The following articles contain lists of wrestlers:

List of amateur wrestlers
List of professional wrestlers
List of Pehlwani wrestlers

See also

 
Lists of sportspeople by sport